Derek Collins (born 15 April 1969 in Glasgow) is a Scottish former professional footballer.

Collins started his playing career with Greenock Morton where he spent over a decade after making his debut in 1987. In 1997 Collins joined Hibernian and returned to Greenock Morton via loan spells at Preston North End, Partick Thistle and Sliema Wanderers of Malta.

In his second spell with Greenock Morton, Collins established himself as the holder of the record number of appearances for the club. (534 appearances, overtaking the previous record holder, David Wylie, by 52 games.)

In January 2005, Collins signed for Gretna where he combined his playing role with coaching duties before becoming a coach full-time for the 2006–07 season.

Derek Collins also has the honour of being the only player to play in all four of Scotland's senior leagues with the same club (Greenock Morton), a feat he achieved when he captained Morton against Gretna in Gretna's first ever Scottish Football League game.

When Davie Irons left Gretna for Morton as manager, Collins went with him as his assistant.

In September 2009, after a poor start to the season, Collins and Irons were sacked by Morton.

Honours
Greenock Morton
 Scottish Second Division: 1994–95
 Scottish Third Division: 2002–03

Hibernian
 Scottish First Division: 1998–99

Partick Thistle
 Scottish Second Division: 2000–01

Gretna
 Scottish Second Division: 2005–06
Scottish Third Division: 2004–05

See also
 List of footballers in Scotland by number of league appearances (500+)

References

External links

1969 births
Living people
Footballers from Glasgow
Scottish footballers
Association football fullbacks
Greenock Morton F.C. players
Hibernian F.C. players
Preston North End F.C. players
Partick Thistle F.C. players
Gretna F.C. players
Greenock Morton F.C. non-playing staff
Scottish Football League players
Scottish Premier League players
Scottish expatriate footballers
Expatriate footballers in Malta